Keota is a city in Keokuk and Washington counties, Iowa, United States. The population was 897 at the time of the 2020 census.

History 
Keota is derived from an Indian name meaning "gone to visit" or "the fire is gone out".

2010 fire 
A large part of historic downtown Keota was damaged by a fire on December 4, 2010. Five buildings on East Broadway were badly damaged or destroyed.

Geography
Keota is located in eastern Keokuk County at  (41.364727, -91.954310). The city limits extend east into Washington County to encompass a golf course.

Demographics

2010 census
As of the census of 2010, there were 1,009 people, 408 households, and 269 families living in the city. The racial makeup of the city was 98.3% White, 0.4% African American, 0.2% Asian, and 1.1% from two or more races. Hispanic or Latino of any race were 0.2% of the population.

There were 408 households, of which 32.4% had children under the age of 18 living with them, 50.7% were married couples living together, 10.5% had a female householder with no husband present, 4.7% had a male householder with no wife present, and 34.1% were non-families. 30.9% of all households were made up of individuals, and 13.9% had someone living alone who was 65 years of age or older. The average household size was 2.40 and the average family size was 2.95.

The median age in the city was 40.5 years. 26.4% of residents were under the age of 18; 5.4% were between the ages of 18 and 24; 22.5% were from 25 to 44; 28.3% were from 45 to 64; and 17.3% were 65 years of age or older. The gender makeup of the city was 49.7% male and 50.3% female.

2000 census
As of the census of 2000, there were 1,025 people, 430 households, and 258 families living in the city. The racial makeup of the city was 98.73% White, 0.29% Native American, 0.49% Asian, 0.39% from other races, and 0.10% from two or more races. Hispanic or Latino of any race were 0.59% of the population.

There were 430 households, out of which 27.7% had children under the age of 18 living with them, 49.1% were married couples living together, 6.7% had a female householder with no husband present, and 39.8% were non-families. 35.6% of all households were made up of individuals, and 21.6% had someone living alone who was 65 years of age or older. The average household size was 2.28 and the average family size was 2.98.

In the city, the population was spread out, with 23.3% under the age of 18, 7.5% from 18 to 24, 25.3% from 25 to 44, 19.9% from 45 to 64, and 24.0% who were 65 years of age or older. The median age was 41 years. For every 100 females, there were 86.0 males. For every 100 females age 18 and over, there were 84.9 males.

The median income for a household in the city was $35,966, and the median income for a family was $43,393. Males had a median income of $30,481 versus $24,479 for females. The per capita income for the city was $17,310. About 7.6% of families and 8.8% of the population were below the poverty line, including 11.7% of those under age 18 and 7.7% of those age 65 or over.

Education
Keota is home to Keota Community School District, that serves for the education of kindergarten through 12th grade. Their mascot is the Eagle. Their school colors are Purple and Gold.

References

External links

 Official website
 The Keota Eagle

Cities in Iowa
Cities in Keokuk County, Iowa
Cities in Washington County, Iowa